Lorada is a 1995 album recorded by French singer Johnny Hallyday. It was released on June 20, 1995, and achieved success in France and Belgium (Wallonia), where, however, it failed to top the charts, being blocked by Michael Jackson's HIStory: Past, Present and Future, Book I and Céline Dion's D'eux. It provided four singles in France, but a sole top ten hit : "J'la croise tous les matins" (#7), "Ne m'oublie pas" (#18), "Quand le masque tombe" (#22) and "Rester libre" (#26). Several songs of the album were written by Jean-Jacques Goldman, including the first hit single.

Track listing
 "Lorada" (Erick Benzi, Gildas Arzel, Jean-Jacques Goldman, Jacques Veneruso) — 0:47
 "Est-ce que tu me veux encore ?" (Gildas Arzel) — 4:42
 "Rester libre" (Erick Benzi, Canada) — 4:01
 "Le regard des autres" (Jean-Jacques Goldman) — 5:10
 "Lady Lucille" (Gildas Arzel) — 4:02
 "Un rêve à faire" (Gildas Arzel) — 4:39
 "J'la croise tous les matins" (Jean-Jacques Goldman) — 4:31
 "Chercher les anges" (Jacques Veneruso) — 6:26
 "Tout feu, toute femme" (Jacques Veneruso) — 4:29
 "Quand le masque tombe" (Erick Benzi) — 4:41
 "Ami" (Erick Benzi) — 3:44
 "Aime-moi" (Erick Benzi) — 4:20
 "Ne m'oublie pas" (Jacques Veneruso, Gildas Arzel, Erick Benzi, Gwenael Arzel) — 4:44

Source : Allmusic.

Personnel
 Musicians
Ian Wallace - drums (tracks 2,3,5-11,13)
Phil Soussan - bass (tracks 2,3,5-11,13)
Jim Prime - organ (tracks 2–5,7-11,13)
Erick Benzi - keyboards (tracks 2–8,10-13)
Erick Benzi (tracks 2,3,7,10), Marc Chantereau (tracks 4,13) - percussion
Robin Le Mesurier (tracks 2–4,7-13), Gildas Arzel (tracks 4,6) - slide guitar
Gildas Arzel (track 2,3,5,7,10,11), Jacques Veneruso (tracks 8,9,13) - electric guitar
Jacques Veneruso (track 2–4,6,7,10-12), Robin Le Mesurier (track 5), Gildas Arzel (tracks 9,12,13), Jean-Jacques Goldman (track 12) - acoustic guitar
Christophe Duplu - harmonica (track 2,4,9,13)
Jim Prime (tracks 5,6), Erick Benzi (track 5) - piano
Erick Benzi - tambourine (track 11)
Erick Benzi (tracks 1–3,5,8-13), Jacques Veneruso (tracks 1–3,5,6,8-13), Gildas Arzel (tracks 1,2,5,6,8-13), Jean-Jacques Goldman (tracks 1,2,8-10,12,13) - backing vocals

 Recording
 Artistic production : Jean-Jacques Goldman
 Arrangements and production : Erick Benzi
 Recorded at Lorada and at Guillaume Tell, by Erick Benzi
 Mixed at Guillaume Tell by Chris Kimsey for Chris Kimsey Production
 Except tracks 7,10 : mixed by Erick Benzi
 Assistants :
 At Lorada : Antonio Martinez
 At Guillaume Tell : Myriam Eddaira, Stéphane Briand and Jérôme Devoise
 Technical team at Lorada : Guy Marseguerra, Guy Laroutis and Luc Vindras
 Engraving : Raphaël Jonin / Dyam
 Photos : Roberto Frankenberg, Gilles LHOTE / OREP and Tony Frank
 Design : Antonietti, Pascault

Releases

Certifications and sales

Charts

Peak positions

End of year charts

References

1995 albums
Johnny Hallyday albums
Albums produced by Erick Benzi